John Gargan (6 June 1928 – 4 February 2007) was an English professional footballer who played as a half-back in the Football League for York City, and in non-League football for Cliftonville.

References

1928 births
Footballers from York
2007 deaths
English footballers
Association football midfielders
York City F.C. players
English Football League players